The Dino 206 S is a sports prototype produced by Ferrari in 1966–1967 under the Dino marque. Ferrari intended to produce at least fifty examples for homologation by the CSI in the Sport 2.0 L Group 4 category. As only 18 were made, the car had to compete in the Prototype 2.0-litre class instead. In spite of this handicap the Dino 206 S took many class wins. The 206 S was the last of the Dino sports racing cars and simultaneously the most produced.

Development
The Dino 206 S had two immediate predecessors. The first was the 1965 Dino 166 P that was the first sports prototype model for the Dino marque and previewed the new rear-engined chassis and revised bodywork. The other, 206 SP, was a starting point for the final 65° DOHC race engine evolution.

The first example of the 206 S model range, s/n 0842, was converted from the 166 P that did not participate in any races. Second example, s/n 0852, still shared the chassis number sequence with Ferrari race cars and was subsequently renumbered as s/n 002, the first in Dino race car sequence.

The 206 S was bodied by Piero Drogo's Carrozzeria Sports Cars in the same style as before, evoking bigger Ferrari prototype cars. The majority were bodied in a spyder style with a roll-bar behind the driver. Only three examples were originally created as fully closed berlinettas. A handful of cars were later rebodied as an open barchettas.

One of the Dino 206 S chassis was used for the Ferrari 212 E Montagna, a uniquely-engined, one-off hillclimb-oriented sports car.

In 1967, at the Frankfurt Auto Show, Pininfarina presented a concept car based on a penultimate 206 S chassis, the Dino Berlinetta Competizione. It was designed by Paolo Martin, and was his first design for the Turin-based studio.

Specifications

The earliest version, tipo 227L, had two valves per cylinder. Later types 231 and 231B received an experimental 3-valve heads. All had twin overhead camshafts per bank. This Dino engine received a newly designed combustion chamber derived directly from the Formula One experience.

The compression ratio was between 10.8 and 11:1. Most engines were equipped with three classic Weber 40DCN15 carburettors but some received the Lucas indirect fuel injection. Either one or two spark plugs per cylinder were installed. As a race engine it also used dry sump lubrication. Top speed was 260–270 km/h.

The drive train consisted of a 5-speed, non-synchro, manual transmission and twin-plate clutch. The chassis type 585, was an evolution of the one already tried in racing and was created out of a welded tubular frame. The front and rear suspension was fully independent. The  wheelbase was shared with both its predecessors. The car used disc brakes all-round and the fuel tank had 100-litres capacity.

Racing

The first racing result was a fifth place in the 1966 12 Hours of Sebring, driven by Lorenzo Bandini and Ludovico Scarfiotti. Three cars entered the 1966 Targa Florio the same year under Ferrari SEFAC team. Jean Guichet and Giancarlo Baghetti finished the race in second place also with a class win. Other cars finished fourteenth and not at all. 1000 km Spa netted sixth and first in the prototype class for Richard Attwood and Jean Guichet.
At the 1000 km Nürburgring, Scarfiotti and Bandini won the Prototype 2.0 class being second overall. Their Dino was 90 seconds behind the 5.4-litre Chaparral. Third was Pedro Rodríguez and Richie Ginther's car out of four Dino cars that entered. Rodriguez also scored a class win at the Nassau Trophy. At the Brands Hatch GP circuit, Mike Parkes scored sixth overall and first in class. The Dino 206 S won VI Coppa Citta di Enna. Also in 1966, the Swiss Mountain Grand Prix was won by Ludovico Scarfiotti.

In 1967, Swedish driver Gustaf Dieden finished Swedish National Falkenberg and GP Swerige in fifth and ninth respectively. Ferdinando "Codones" Latteri and Pietro Lo Piccolo scored many overall and class wins between 1967 and 1969.

Hillclimbing

Ludovico Scarfiotti, a 1962 and 1965 European Hill Climb champion entered, with success, many hillclimb events in the 206 S. His 1965 championship was achieved in an earlier Dino model, the 206 SP. From June 1966, he contested the series as part of a Scuderia Sant'Ambroeus entry. He drove a works prototype Dino, s/n 0842. Scarfiotti scored a second place at Rossfeld and an overall win in the Cesana-Sestriere hillclimb. The Freiburg-Schauinsland hillclimb also yielded a second position with another victory at Sierre-Montana. And so for 1966, Ludovico Scarfiotti achieved a second overall place at the European Hill Climb Championship, behind Gerhard Mitter in a dominant Porsche 910 Coupé. Next year he participated in a one more hillclimb, this time at the very challenging Trento-Bondone, finishing second overall and a second in class as well.

A Scuderia Sant'Ambroeus also fielded Edoardo Lualdi-Gabardi in the hillclimbing events. Lualdi had raced two cars throughout the 1966–1968. In 1966, his 206 S Spyder s/n 016, was used in no less than fifteen different hillclimbing races, winning six of them overall, with additional four-second places and simultaneous class wins to his name. For the 1967 and 1968 seasons he changed into yet another Spyder model, this time s/n 028, that he entered privately. Throughout those two seasons he entered thirty-four races, most of them of a hillclimbing nature. He won overall or in class at least twenty of them, with another seven second places on the podium. One of the victories was at the 1967 Trieste-Opicina hillclimb. In 1966, he placed sixth at the Trento-Bondone Hill Climb, but was unable to finish the dramatic race on the next two occasions.

Collectability

The Dino 206 S race cars from the period are collectable but are not fetching as high prices as their bigger Ferrari siblings. It is mostly due to a lesser engines and niche race series that they participated in. Also the Dino marque history is not all that well known to the public. The cars usually have a race history and are limited in numbers.
Chassis number 006 car with an original Piero Drogo bodywork was sold in 2012 at RM Sotheby's auction for €2.5 million. The same auction house offered a s/n 028 car, as driven by Edoardo Lualdi-Gabardi in various hillclimbing events, but extensively converted at the later stage of its career. It still achieved a high bid of €2 million. More recently, in 2015, Gooding & Company auctioned the 206 S Spyder from the Peter Klutt collection, s/n 026 for US$2.3 million.

Gallery

References

Bibliography

External links

Dino 206 S: Ferrari History

Dino 206 S
Sports prototypes
Cars introduced in 1967
Rear mid-engine, rear-wheel-drive vehicles